The Frank E. Robins House is a historic house at 567 Locust Street in Conway, Arkansas, United States.  It is a -story wood-frame structure, most of its exterior finished in brick veneer.  It has a gabled roof pierced by gabled dormers, and an enclosed two-story porch extending to the left.  The front entrance is framed by pilasters and topped by an entablature and deep cornice with supporting brackets.  The house was built in 1922 for a prominent local newspaper publisher who also served as Conway's mayor.

The house was listed on the National Register of Historic Places in 1994.

See also
National Register of Historic Places listings in Faulkner County, Arkansas

References

Houses on the National Register of Historic Places in Arkansas
Colonial Revival architecture in Arkansas
Houses completed in 1922
Houses in Conway, Arkansas